Mumbai traffic police is the organisation entrusted with the task of managing vehicular traffic in Mumbai, India.

See also
 Public transport in Mumbai

References

External links
  Traffic Police Mumbai Website 

Mumbai Police
Transport organisations based in India
Transport in Mumbai
Government agencies with year of establishment missing